The Ghost and the House of Truth is a Nigerian film released in 2019 and produced by Ego Boyo. It was directed by Africa Magic Viewers’ Choice Award and Africa Movie Academy Award Winner, Akin Omotoso. It was released under the production studios' of Temple Productions Slate,1 Films, and The Mission entertainment. "The Ghost and the House of Truth" is the sixth film from the stables of the Temple Productions and the second collaborative work with Akin Omotoso, the director and Ego Boyo, the producer.

The film stars Toyin Oshinaike, Kate Henshaw, Susan Wokoma, Mario Obruthe, Imoleayo Olusanya and Dara Egerton-Shyngle. The film depicts the criminally less-discussed effect of missing children and the dangers they are exposed to.

Synopsis 
The Ghost and the House of Truth gives a narrative of Bola Ogun (Susan Wokoma), a counsellor in Nigeria, West Africa. She's a single mother with a daughter named Nike. Her occupation involves advising people to let go of past occurrences or events that might have caused damages or affected the patient negatively and live for the present and future. However, she was put to the test and became a victim herself when her daughter Nike goes missing and is believed to have been murdered, leading to a series of unpleasant events and days of suffering for this counsellor who must now work hand in hand with the Local Police to bring her daughter back home.

Cast 
•Kate Henshaw.

•Susan Wokoma.

•Kemi Lala Akindoju.

•Ijeoma Grace Agu.

•Gloria Young.

•Tope Tedela.

•Ṣeun Ajayi,.

•Fabian Lojede

•Toyin Oshinaike.

•Imoleayo Olusanya.

 Mario Obruthe.

Reception 
The film was the official closing film for The Africa International Film Festival where it premiered. It opened FilmAfrica in London.

Premiere 
Globally, the film was first premiered on 20 September 2019, at the Urban World Film Festival, EMC Empire Theater 12, New York City, United States of America. Regionally, it was on 15 November 2019, at the Africa International Film Festival (AFRIFF) The film was screened nationwide on 22 November 2019. The film is now streaming on Showmax and BETplus.

Awards and nominations

References

External links 

2019 films
English-language Nigerian films
Nigerian action thriller films
Nigerian action drama films
2010s English-language films
Films directed by Akin Omotoso